Travis Marx (born October 25, 1977) is an American mixed martial artist who formerly competed in Bellator's bantamweight division.

Background
Marx was born and raised in Roosevelt, Utah. He was a three-time state wrestling champion at Union High School and placed third in NJCAA at Ricks College (later renamed Brigham Young University-Idaho). He worked toward his degrees in Sociology and Spanish, making a two-year mission trip to Patagonia for the LDS Church.

Marx is also a former Utah Highway Patrol member and currently lives in New Mexico.

Mixed martial arts career

Early career: Ultimate Combat Experience
Marx started his career in 2003. He fought mainly for Utah's promotion Ultimate Combat Experience. Within five years — with an idle period in MMA between July 2003 and March 2007 — he compiled a record of nine victories and no losses.

Jeremy Horn's Elite Fight Night and Throwdown Showdown
Marx had his first career's defeat against fellow prospect Steven Siler. Beyond that, he obtained six more victories between 2008–2009, including a victory over Rad Martinez and a no contest against Nick Mamalis.

Nemesis Fighting, Jackson's MMA and Clash in the Cage
Marx fought in the controversial event Nemesis Fighting: MMA Global Invasion against Jose Tezanos, in which he lost via unanimous decision. The promotion was later accused of not paying some fighters and the case was taken up by the U.S. Secret Service.

Marx faced Gracie Arizona's Ray Robinson in June 2011 at Jackson's MMA Series 5. He won via submission early in the first round.

Marx faced Mikey Lovato in September 2011 at Clash in the Cage. He defeated Lovato via submission due to strikes in the first round.

With three victories in a row in 2011, Marx signed with Bellator to compete in the bantamweight tournament.

Bellator MMA

Marx made his debut on April 6, 2012 at Bellator 64 in the quarterfinal match of Bellator season six bantamweight tournament against former Shooto featherweight champion Masakatsu Ueda. Marx won via unanimous decision (29-28, 29–28, 29-28) and advanced to the semifinals.

In the semifinals on May 11, 2012 at Bellator 68, Marx faced Marcos Galvão. He lost via unanimous decision (29-28, 29–28, 29-28).

Marx faced former WEC bantamweight champion Chase Beebe on February 21, 2013 at Bellator 90. He defeated Beebe via unanimous decision (30-27, 30–27, 30-27).

Marx faced Brandon Bender in the semifinal match of Bellator season nine bantamweight tournament on September 20, 2013 at Bellator 100. He managed to come through a hard first round defending an anaconda choke and won via TKO in the second round.

Marx faced Joe Warren in the finals on November 8, 2013 at Bellator 107. He lost the fight via TKO in the second round.

Marx was released from Bellator following his loss to Warren, leaving with a 3–2 record within the promotion.

Championships and accomplishments
Bellator Fighting Championships
Bellator Season 9 Bantamweight Tournament Runner-Up

Mixed martial arts record

|-
|Loss
|align=center| 21–5 (1)
|Joe Warren
|TKO (punches)
|Bellator 107
|
|align=center| 2
|align=center| 1:54
|Thackerville, Oklahoma, United States
|
|-
|Win
|align=center|21–4 (1)
|Brandon Bender
|TKO (knee to the body and punches)
|Bellator 100
|
|align=center|2
|align=center|4:28
|Phoenix, Arizona, United States
|
|-
|Win
|align=center|20–4 (1)
|Chase Beebe
|Decision (unanimous)
|Bellator 90
|
|align=center|3
|align=center|5:00
|West Valley City, Utah, United States
|
|-
|Loss
|align=center|19–4 (1)
|Marcos Galvão
|Decision (unanimous)
|Bellator 68
|
|align=center|3
|align=center|5:00
|Atlantic City, New Jersey, United States
|
|-
|Win
|align=center|19–3 (1)
|Masakatsu Ueda
|Decision (unanimous)
|Bellator 64
|
|align=center|3
|align=center|5:00
|Windsor, Ontario, Canada
|
|-
|Win
|align=center|18–3 (1)
|Mikey Lovato
|Submission (punches)
|Fresquez Productions - Clash in the Cage
|
|align=center|1
|align=center|1:38
|Albuquerque, New Mexico, United States
|
|-
|Win
|align=center|17–3 (1)
|Ray Robinson
|Submission (choke)
|JMMAS - Jackson's MMA Series 5
|
|align=center|1
|align=center|0:56
|Albuquerque, New Mexico, United States
|
|-
|Win
|align=center|16–3 (1)
|Trevor Mellen
|Decision (split)
|Showdown Fights 3 - New Blood
|
|align=center|3
|align=center|5:00
|Orem, Utah, United States
|
|-
|Loss
|align=center|15–3 (1)
|Jose Tezanos
|Decision (unanimous)
|Nemesis Fighting: MMA Global Invasion
|
|align=center|3
|align=center|5:00
|Punta Cana, Dominican Republic
|
|-
|Loss
|align=center|15–2 (1)
|Richie Whitson
|Decision (unanimous)
|Prestige - MMA 1
|
|align=center|3
|align=center|5:00
|Fort McMurray, Alberta, Canada
|
|-
|Win
|align=center|15–1 (1)
|Jeff Willingham
|Submission (rear-naked choke)
|JHEFN - Jeremy Horn's Elite Fight Night 10
|
|align=center|2
|align=center|1:32
|Layton, Utah, United States
|
|-
|Win
|align=center|14–1 (1)
|Angelo Duarte
|Submission (rear-naked choke)
|JHEFN - Jeremy Horn's Elite Fight Night 9
|
|align=center|1
|align=center|4:30
|Layton, Utah, United States
|
|-
|Win
|align=center|13–1 (1)
|Nick Buschman
|TKO (doctor stoppage)
|JHEFN - Jeremy Horn's Elite Fight Night 7
|
|align=center|2
|align=center|5:00
|Layton, Utah, United States
|
|-
|Win
|align=center|12–1 (1)
|Jesse Brock
|Decision (unanimous)
|Throwdown Showdown 3 - Big Time
|
|align=center|3
|align=center|5:00
|Salt Lake City, Utah, United States
|
|-
|Win
|align=center|11–1 (1)
|Scott Grimm
|Submission
|JHEFN - Jeremy Horn's Elite Fight Night 5
|
|align=center|1
|align=center|1:01
|Layton, Utah, United States
|
|-
|Loss
|align=center|10–1 (1)
|Steven Siler
|Submission (triangle choke)
|JHEFN - Jeremy Horn's Elite Fight Night 2
|
|align=center|2
|align=center|3:35
|Salt Lake City, Utah, United States
|
|-
|Win
|align=center|10–0 (1)
|Rad Martinez
|Decision (unanimous)
|Throwdown Showdown 1 - Showdown
|
|align=center|3
|align=center|5:00
|Orem, Utah, United States
|
|-
|NC
|align=center|9–0 (1)
|Nick Mamalis
|No contest
|JHEFN - Jeremy Horn's Elite Fight Night 1
|
|align=center|2
|align=center|3:33
|Salt Lake City, Utah, United States
|
|-
|Win
|align=center|9–0
|Dan Berry
|TKO (punches)
|UCE - Round 28 - Worlds Collide
|
|align=center|1
|align=center|0:46
|Salt Lake City, Utah, United States
|
|-
|Win
|align=center|8–0
|Serge Rochon
|Submission (rear-naked choke)
|GFS - Colosseum 6
|
|align=center|1
|align=center|N/A
|Winnipeg, Manitoba, Canada
|
|-
|Win
|align=center|7–0
|Tim Moon
|TKO (corner stoppage)
|UCE - Round 27 - Finals
|
|align=center|2
|align=center|5:00
|Salt Lake City, Utah, United States
|
|-
|Win
|align=center|6–0
|Walter Buse
|Decision (split)
|UCE - Round 25 - Finals
|
|align=center|3
|align=center|3:00
|West Valley City, Utah, United States
|
|-
|Win
|align=center|5–0
|Dan Berry
|Submission (rear-naked choke)
|UCE - Round 25 - Episode 9 "Day 2"
|
|align=center|1
|align=center|1:13
|Salt Lake City, Utah, United States
|
|-
|Win
|align=center|4–0
|Josh Buck
|Submission
|Utah County - Main Event FC
|
|align=center|1
|align=center|N/A
|Orem, Utah, United States
|
|-
|Win
|align=center|3–0
|Robert Densley
|TKO
|UCE - Round 4 - Finals
|
|align=center|2
|align=center|N/A
|Salt Lake City, Utah, United States
|
|-
|Win
|align=center|2–0
|Matt Raines
|Submission
|UCE - Round 4 - Semi-Finals
|
|align=center|3
|align=center|N/A
|Salt Lake City, Utah, United States
|
|-
|Win
|align=center|1–0
|Craig Perez
|Submission
|UCE - Round 4 - Episode 3
|
|align=center|1
|align=center|N/A
|Salt Lake City, Utah, United States
|

References

1977 births
Living people
American male sport wrestlers
Amateur wrestlers
People from Roosevelt, Utah
American male mixed martial artists
Mixed martial artists from Utah
Bantamweight mixed martial artists
Mixed martial artists utilizing collegiate wrestling